The 2012 Manitoba Scotties Tournament of Hearts, Manitoba's women's provincial curling championship, was held from January 25 to 29 at the Portage Credit Union Centre in Portage la Prairie, Manitoba. The winning team of Jennifer Jones, Kaitlyn Lawes, Jill Officer and Dawn Askin represented Manitoba at the 2012 Scotties Tournament of Hearts in Red Deer, Alberta, where they finished round robin with a 9-2 record, which was enough to finish 1st place and clinch a spot in the playoffs. Jones would lose both the 1-2 game and the semi-final before winning the bronze medal game over Quebec.

Qualification Process
Sixteen teams will qualify for the provincial tournament through several berths. The qualification process is as follows:

Notes
 Originally, the Eastman region was to be awarded a berth, but because there were no entries in the region qualifier, the berth was awarded to the Interlake region.
 These berths were awarded to the sport regions based upon each region's participation ratio.

Teams

Asham Black Group

Red Brick Red Group

Standings

Asham Black Group

Red Brick Red Group

Results

Draw 1
January 25, 8:30 AM CT

Draw 2
January 25, 12:15 PM CT

Draw 3
January 25, 4:00 PM CT

Draw 4
January 25, 8:15 PM CT

Draw 5
January 26, 8:30 AM CT

Draw 6
January 26, 12:15 PM CT

Draw 7
January 26, 4:00 PM CT

Draw 8
January 26, 7:45 PM CT

Draw 9
January 27, 8:30 AM CT

Draw 10
January 27, 12:15 PM CT

Draw 11
January 27, 4:00 PM CT

Draw 12
January 27, 7:45 PM CT

Draw 13
January 28, 8:30 AM CT

Draw 14
January 28, 12:15 PM CT

Tiebreaker
January 28, 4:00 PM CT

Playoffs

B1 vs. R1
January 28, 7:45 PM CT

B2 vs. R2
January 28, 7:45 PM CT

Semifinal
January 29, 9:30 AM CT

Final
January 29, 1:30 PM CT

Qualifying Events

Scotties Berth Bonspiel
The 2012 Scotties Berth Bonspiel, presented by Monsanto, took place from November 11 to 14, 2011, at the Assiniboine Memorial Curling Club, in Winnipeg. The event was held in a triple knockout format, and qualified two teams, Michelle Montford and Barb Spencer, into the provincial playdowns.

A Event

B Event

C Event

Playoffs

Regional Playdowns

Central
The Central Regional Playdowns took place from December 17 to 18, 2011, at the Plumas Curling Club in Plumas. The event qualified two teams to the provincial playdowns.

A Event

B Event

Interlake
The Interlake Regional Playdowns took place from December 17 to 18, 2011, at the Winnipeg Curling Club in Winnipeg Beach. The event qualified two teams to the provincial playdowns.

A Event

B Event

Norman
The Norman Regional Playdowns took place from December 17 to 18, 2011, at The Pas Curling Club in The Pas. The event qualified one team to the provincial playdowns.

Parkland
The Parkland Regional Playdowns took place from December 17 to 18, 2011, at the Dauphin Curling Club in Dauphin. The event qualified one team to the provincial playdowns.

Westman
The Westman Regional Playdowns took place from December 17 to 18, 2011, at the Brandon Curling Club in Brandon. The event qualified two teams to the provincial playdowns.

A Event

B Event

Winnipeg
The Winnipeg Regional Playdowns took place from December 16 to 18, 2011, at the Victoria Curling Club in Winnipeg. The event qualified three teams to the provincial playdowns.

A Event

B Event

Eastman
The Eastman Regional Playdowns were scheduled to be held from December 17 to 18, 2011, at the Ste. Anne Curling Club in Ste. Anne. There were no entries for this event, and, as a result, an extra berth was awarded to the Interlake Region.

References

Manitoba
Manitoba Scotties Tournament of Hearts
Sport in Portage la Prairie
Curling in Manitoba
2012 in Manitoba